The Old Nicolet High School is a historic school located in De Pere, Wisconsin, USA.

History
The building was a public high school until 1958. That year, it was purchased by the Norbertines and it was reopened as the Catholic boys' school Abbot Pennings High School in 1959. In 1990, the building was bought by the nearby Norbertine institution St. Norbert College and has since been used for classrooms and offices. Abbot Pennings High School was closed and consolidated with two other local single-sex Catholic high schools to form the coeducational Notre Dame Academy.

The building was added to the State and the National Register of Historic Places in 2015.  It was listed on the National Register as Nicolet High School.

References

Properties of religious function on the National Register of Historic Places in Wisconsin
School buildings on the National Register of Historic Places in Wisconsin
Office buildings on the National Register of Historic Places in Wisconsin
National Register of Historic Places in Brown County, Wisconsin
Schools in Brown County, Wisconsin
St. Norbert College
Catholic schools in Wisconsin
Catholic high schools in the United States
Neoclassical architecture in Wisconsin
Brick buildings and structures
School buildings completed in 1923
1923 establishments in Wisconsin